The Mungo Park Medal is awarded by the Royal Scottish Geographical Society in recognition of outstanding contributions to geographical knowledge through exploration and/or research, and/or work of a practical nature of benefit to humanity in potentially hazardous physical and/or social environments.
It was founded in honour of the Scottish explorer Mungo Park.

Winners

See also

 List of geography awards

References

Awards of the Royal Scottish Geographical Society
Awards established in 1930